Belief is the second album of the British EBM group Nitzer Ebb. It was the first album recorded with drummer Julian Beeston (who took over from David Gooday), and Flood took over as producer from Phil Harding.

The fifth song on the album, "T.W.A.", appears to have been inspired by the Hezbollah hijacking of TWA flight 847 in 1985.

In a 1989 retrospective for Rolling Stone, Jim Farber wrote that the music video for "Control, I'm Here" had "the most harshly industrial visuals of the year".

Track listing
 "Hearts & Minds" – 3:45
 "For Fun" – 3:03
 "Control, I'm Here" – 3:52
 "Captivate" – 3:57
 "T.W.A." – 5:00
 "Blood Money" – 4:29
 "Shame" – 4:03
 "Drive" – 5:07
 "Without Belief" – 4:16

References

External links

1989 albums
Albums produced by Flood (producer)
Geffen Records albums
Mute Records albums
Nitzer Ebb albums